Pilocrocis is a genus of moths of the family Crambidae. The genus was first erected by Julius Lederer in 1863.

Species
Pilocrocis acutangula Hampson, 1899
Pilocrocis angulifera Kenrick, 1912
Pilocrocis anigrusalis (Walker, 1859)
Pilocrocis bastalis Schaus, 1920
Pilocrocis buckleyi (Druce, 1895)
Pilocrocis calamistis Hampson, 1899
Pilocrocis caustichroalis Hampson, 1918
Pilocrocis confixalis (Walker, 1866)
Pilocrocis coptobasis Hampson, 1899
Pilocrocis cryptalis (Druce, 1895)
Pilocrocis cuprealis Hampson, 1912
Pilocrocis cuprescens Hampson, 1917
Pilocrocis cyranonalis Schaus, 1920
Pilocrocis cyrisalis (Druce, 1895)
Pilocrocis deltalis Viette, 1958
Pilocrocis dentilinealis Schaus, 1920
Pilocrocis dichocrosialis Hampson, 1912
Pilocrocis dithyralis Hampson, 1912
Pilocrocis dohrnialis E. Hering, 1901
Pilocrocis evanidalis Schaus, 1920
Pilocrocis fanovalis Viette, 1958
Pilocrocis flagellalis Dognin, 1909
Pilocrocis flavicorpus Hampson, 1917
Pilocrocis floccosa (E. Hering, 1901)
Pilocrocis fulviflavalis Hampson, 1917
Pilocrocis fumidalis Hampson, 1912
Pilocrocis gillippusalis (Walker, 1859)
Pilocrocis glaucitalis Hampson, 1912
Pilocrocis granjae F. Hoffmann, 1934
Pilocrocis guianalis Schaus, 1920
Pilocrocis hypoleucalis Hampson, 1912
Pilocrocis isozona (Meyrick, 1936)
Pilocrocis italavalis Viette, 1958
Pilocrocis janinalis Viette, 1958
Pilocrocis lactealis Hampson, 1912
Pilocrocis laralis Hampson, 1909
Pilocrocis latifuscalis Hampson, 1899
Pilocrocis melangnatha Hampson, 1912
Pilocrocis melastictalis Hampson, 1912
Pilocrocis metachrysias Hampson, 1918
Pilocrocis milvinalis (Swinhoe, 1885)
Pilocrocis modestalis Schaus, 1912
Pilocrocis monothyralis Hampson, 1912
Pilocrocis musalis Schaus, 1912
Pilocrocis nubilinea Bethune-Baker, 1909
Pilocrocis pachyceralis Hampson, 1917
Pilocrocis patagialis Hampson, 1909
Pilocrocis phaeocoryla Ghesquière, 1942
Pilocrocis plicatalis Hampson, 1912
Pilocrocis polialis Schaus, 1927
Pilocrocis pterygodia Hampson, 1912
Pilocrocis purpurascens Hampson, 1899
Pilocrocis ramentalis Lederer, 1863
Pilocrocis rectilinealis (Kenrick, 1917)
Pilocrocis reniferalis Hampson, 1912
Pilocrocis rooalis (Snellen, 1875)
Pilocrocis roxonalis (Druce, 1895)
Pilocrocis runatalis Dyar, 1914
Pilocrocis sororalis Schaus, 1920
Pilocrocis synomotis (Meyrick, 1894)
Pilocrocis xanthostictalis Hampson, 1908
Pilocrocis xanthozonalis Hampson, 1912

Former species
Pilocrocis ingeminata Meyrick, 1933

References

 
Spilomelinae
Crambidae genera
Taxa named by Julius Lederer